Events from the year 1537 in Sweden

Incumbents
 Monarch – Gustav I

Events

 The Gripsholm Castle is constructed.
 The first evangelical Catechism of Olaus Petri is published. 
 A royal edict bans the public of Småland to hunt, gather wood and settle in the woods.

Births

 20 December - John III of Sweden, monarch  (died 1592)

Deaths

References

 
Years of the 16th century in Sweden
Sweden